Foetus is a 1994 Hungarian drama film directed by Márta Mészáros. It was entered into the 44th Berlin International Film Festival.

Cast
 Adél Kováts as Anna
 Aliona Antonova as Teréz
 Jan Nowicki as Péter
 Barbara Hegyi as Judit
 László Bolyki as Anna férje
 Hanka Biazejczak
 Enikő Börcsök
 Attila Csáky
 Zsuzsa Czinkóczi
 Zoltán Farkas
 Pongrác Gonda

References

External links

1994 films
1990s Hungarian-language films
1994 drama films
Films directed by Márta Mészáros
Hungarian drama films